Wilfried Geeroms (14 July 1941 – 4 May 1999) was a Belgian hurdler. He competed in the 400 metres hurdles at the 1964 Summer Olympics and the 1968 Summer Olympics.

References

1941 births
1999 deaths
Athletes (track and field) at the 1964 Summer Olympics
Athletes (track and field) at the 1968 Summer Olympics
Belgian male hurdlers
Olympic athletes of Belgium
Place of birth missing